Jan Chmelar (born 5 May 1981) is a retired Swedish ice hockey goaltender. Chmelar was part of the Djurgården Swedish champions' team of 2000.

References

External links

Swedish ice hockey goaltenders
BK Mladá Boleslav players
Djurgårdens IF Hockey players
HC Benátky nad Jizerou players
Huddinge IK players
1981 births
Living people
People from Huddinge Municipality
Sportspeople from Stockholm County
Swedish expatriate ice hockey people
Swedish expatriate sportspeople in the Czech Republic
Expatriate ice hockey players in the Czech Republic